Brandye Hendrickson was named Deputy Administrator of the Federal Highway Administration on July 24, 2017, after having been Commissioner of the Indiana Department of Transportation. She also became Acting Administrator of the Federal Highway Administration until Nicole Nason was confirmed by the Senate. On July 19, 2019, Brandye left her position to take another Deputy position as American Association of State Highway and Transportation Officials.

She has a bachelor's degree from Indiana University Bloomington (1995) and is a professional in Human Resources.

References

Year of birth missing (living people)
Living people
Administrators of the Federal Highway Administration
Indiana University Bloomington alumni
Trump administration personnel